Araguaína Airport  is the airport serving Araguaína, Brazil.

It is operated by Esaero.

History
The airport is the main gateway to the Northern region of the state of Tocantins, and Southern region of the states of Pará and Maranhão. 

The airport has been renovated and works included the ramp, runway, runway lighting, and the terminal building.

Airlines and destinations

Access

Gallery

See also

List of airports in Brazil

References

External links

Airports in Tocantins